Kristijan Čaval (born 11 October 1978) is a retired Croatian football midfielder, who played for NK Rijeka in Croatia's Prva HNL for most of his career.

Club career
Čaval played two matches for the Croatia national under-20 football team in 1998.

He came out of retirement in 2016 to play for fourth-tier club NK Grobničan.

Career statistics

Honours
Rijeka
Croatian Cup: 2005

Grobničan
4. HNL – Zapad: 2017–18

References

External links

1978 births
Living people
Footballers from Rijeka
Association football midfielders
Croatian footballers
HNK Rijeka players
NK Kamen Ingrad players
FK Dinamo Tirana players
HNK Šibenik players
NK Slaven Belupo players
NK Grobničan players
Croatian Football League players
Kategoria Superiore players
Croatian expatriate footballers
Expatriate footballers in Albania
Croatian expatriate sportspeople in Albania
HNK Rijeka non-playing staff